Judith Theresa Roberts (May 15, 1934 – November 22, 2016) was an American competition swimmer who represented the United States at the 1952 Summer Olympics in Helsinki, Finland.  Roberts competed in the women's 100-meter freestyle, advanced to the semifinals, and finished fourteenth overall with a time of 1:08.2.

Three years later at the 1955 Pan American Games in Mexico City, she won a gold medal as a member of the winning U.S. team in the women's 4×100-meter freestyle relay.  Her American relay teammates at the Pan American Games included Carolyn Green, Wanda Werner and Gretchen Kluter.

References

1934 births
2016 deaths
American female freestyle swimmers
Olympic swimmers of the United States
Sportspeople from Dallas
Swimmers at the 1952 Summer Olympics
Swimmers at the 1955 Pan American Games
Pan American Games gold medalists for the United States
Pan American Games medalists in swimming
Medalists at the 1955 Pan American Games
21st-century American women